The 1989 Big East men's basketball tournament took place at Madison Square Garden in New York City, from March 9 to March 12, 1989. Its winner received the Big East Conference's automatic bid to the 1989 NCAA tournament. It is a single-elimination tournament with four rounds.  Georgetown had the best regular season conference record and received the #1 seed.

Georgetown defeated Syracuse in the championship game 88–79, to claim its sixth Big East tournament championship.

Bracket

First round summary

Quarterfinals summary

Semifinals summary

Championship game summary

Announcers

Awards
Dave Gavitt Trophy (Most Valuable Player): Charles Smith, Georgetown

All Tournament Team
 Dana Barros, Boston College
 Sherman Douglas, Syracuse
 John Morton, Seton Hall
 Alonzo Mourning, Georgetown
 Ramón Ramos, Seton Hall
 Charles Smith, Georgetown

References

External links
 

Tournament
Big East men's basketball tournament
Basketball in New York City
College sports in New York City
Sports competitions in New York City
Sports in Manhattan
Big East men's basketball tournament
Big East men's basketball tournament
1980s in Manhattan
Madison Square Garden